Allograpta exotica is a species in the family Syrphidae ("syrphid flies"), in the order Diptera ("flies"). Larvae are often predators of aphids. Their life cycle from egg to adults is around 15 days, with adults living for approximately 10 days.

References

Further reading

External links

Diptera.info
NCBI Taxonomy Browser, Allograpta exotica

Syrphini
Insects described in 1830
Diptera of North America
Taxa named by Christian Rudolph Wilhelm Wiedemann